The Fairbanks Ice Dogs are a Tier II junior ice hockey team in the North American Hockey League's Midwest Division. The Ice Dogs play home games at the 2,200-seat Big Dipper Ice Arena in Fairbanks, Alaska.

History
Originally started in 1997 in the Tier III Junior B Western States Hockey League (WSHL) as a hockey program to replace the Alaska Gold Kings and give Alaskan players a chance to play after they finished high school and/or midgets. The Ice Dogs won the Northern Division its inaugural season, but lost to the Southern champs the following year in exhibition games. In 1998–99 season, they again won the Northern Division but lost to the Southern Division champions, the Ventura Mariners.

In 2000, the Ice Dogs became a member of the Tier III Junior B Northern Pacific Hockey League (NorPac) and also played sixteen games in the Tier III Junior A America West Hockey League (AWHL) to help fill out their schedule in the 2000–01 season. The team would go on to win the NorPac championship in that season before leaving for the higher level AWHL full-time for the 2001–02 season.

The Ice Dogs were named the 2001–02 AWHL Organization of the Year in their first full Junior A season. The team moved to the NAHL in the AWHL-NAHL merger that took place in 2003. The Ice Dogs were upset in the West Division Finals in the 2008–09 season after winning the West Division regular season title. The Ice Dogs lost in the 2010 Robertson Cup final to the Bismarck Bobcats 3–0. The following season the Ice Dogs won the Robertson Cup for the first time in a come from behind win over the Michigan Warriors 4–2. In the 2013–14 season, the Ice Dogs once more won the West Division regular season title (fourth time in six years) and proceeded to win the Robertson Cup for the second time.

The Ice Dogs had continued success, leading their division in four of the next five seasons and winning a third Robertson Cup in 2016. They were again the division leaders when the 2019–20 season was cancelled midseason due to the COVID-19 pandemic. Due to travel restrictions in the state of Alaska and the rest of the United States during the pandemic, the Ice Dogs temporarily relocated to Marshall, Minnesota, for most of the 2020–21 season before returning to Alaska in mid-April 2021.

During the 2021–22 season, longtime head coach Trevor Stewert resigned to pursue an associate head coach position in the NCAA Division I and was replaced by former NHL player Dave Allison.

Season-by-season records

Playoffs

2004
Information unavailable
2005
First Round – Team USA defeated Fairbanks Ice Dogs 3-games-to-0
2006
First Round – Fairbanks Ice Dogs defeated Wasilla Spirit 3-games-to-0
Second Round – Bozeman Icedogs defeated Fairbanks Ice Dogs 4-games-to-1
2007
First Round – St. Louis Bandits defeated Fairbanks Ice Dogs 3-games-to-0
Fairbanks Ice Dogs advance to Round Robin as HOST.
Robertson Cup Round Robin – Fairbanks Ice Dogs(0-3) - Qualify for Consolation Game (L, 3-7 vs. Phantoms; L, 1-4 vs. Bandits; L, 3-5 vs. Express)
Robertson Cup Consolation Game – Southern Minnesota Express defeated Fairbanks Ice Dogs 3-2
2008
First Round – Fairbanks Ice Dogs defeated Wichita Falls Wildcats 3-games-to-1
Second Round – Topeka RoadRunners defeated Fairbanks Ice Dogs 3-games-to-2
2009
First Round – Fairbanks Ice Dogs defeated Kenai River Brown Bears 3-games-to-0
Second Round – Wenatchee Wild defeated Fairbanks Ice Dogs 3-games-to-1
2010
First Round – Fairbanks Ice Dogs defeated Alaska Avalanche 3-games-to-0
Second Round – Wenatchee Wild defeated Fairbanks Ice Dogs 3-games-to-0
Fairbanks Ice Dogs advance to Round Robin as West representatives as Wenachee Wild is HOST.
Robertson Cup Round Robin – Fairbanks Ice Dogs (3-1) - Qualify for Championship game (W, 3-2 vs. Wild; W, 4-3 vs. Bandits; L, 1-2 vs. North Stars; W, 4-3 vs. Bobcats)
Robertson Cup Final – Bismarck Bobcats defeated Fairbanks Ice Dogs 3-0
2011
Division Semifinals – Fairbanks Ice Dogs defeated Kenai River Brown Bears 3-games-to-0
Division Finals – Fairbanks Ice Dogs defeated Wenatchee Wild 3-games-to-1
Robertson Cup Round Robin – Fairbanks Ice Dogs (3-0) - Qualify for Championship game (W, 4-3 vs. RoadRunners; W, 4-2 vs. Warriors; W, 2-1 vs. Bulls)
Robertson Cup Final – Fairbanks Ice Dogs defeated Michigan Warriors 4-2
Robertson Cup Champions
2012
Divisional Semifinals – Fairbanks Ice Dogs defeated Kenai River Brown Bears 3-games-to-0
Divisional Finals – Fairbanks Ice Dogs defeated Wenatchee Wild 3-games-to-0
Robertson Cup Round Robin – Fairbanks Ice Dogs (2-1) - Qualify for Semifinal (L, 1-3 vs. Bandits; W, 3-1 vs. Bulls; W, 4-3 vs. Fighting Falcons)
Robertson Cup Semifinal game – Texas Tornado defeated Fairbanks Ice Dogs 4-3
2013
Divisional Semifinals – Fairbanks Ice Dogs defeated Kenai River Brown Bears 3-games-to-2
Divisional Finals – Wenatchee Wild defeated Fairbanks Ice Dogs 3-games-to-2
2014
Divisional Semifinals – Fairbanks Ice Dogs defeated Kenai River Brown Bears 3-games-to-2
Divisional Finals – Fairbanks Ice Dogs defeated Michigan Warriors 2-games-to-0
Robertson Cup Semifinals – Fairbanks Ice Dogs defeated Wenatchee Wild 3-games-to-2
Robertson Cup Finals – Fairbanks Ice Dogs defeated Austin Bruins 2-games-to-0
Robertson Cup Champions
2015
Robertson Cup 1st Round Series – Fairbanks Ice Dogs defeated Minnesota Magicians 3-games-to-0
Robertson Cup Quarterfinals – Minnesota Wilderness defeated Fairbanks Ice Dogs 3-games-to-0
2016
Divisional Semifinals – Fairbanks Ice Dogs defeated Coulee Region Chill 3-games-to-1
Divisional Finals – Fairbanks Ice Dogs defeated Minnesota Wilderness 3-games-to-2
Robertson Cup Semifinals – Fairbanks Ice Dogs defeated Aston Rebels 2-games-to-0
Robertson Cup Championship game – Fairbanks Ice Dogs defeated Wichita Falls Wildcats 2–0
Robertson Cup Champions
2017
Divisional Semifinals – Fairbanks Ice Dogs defeated Minnesota Magicians 3-games-to-0
Division Finals – Janesville Jets defeated Fairbanks Ice Dogs 3-games-to-1
2018
Divisional Semifinals – Fairbanks Ice Dogs defeated Minnesota Magicians 3-games-to-0
Division Finals – Fairbanks Ice Dogs defeated Janesville Jets 3-games-to-2
Robertson Cup Semifinals – Minot Minotauros defeated Fairbanks Ice Dogs 2-games-to-1
2019
Divisional Semifinals – Fairbanks Ice Dogs defeated Janesville Jets 3-games-to-0 
Division Finals – Fairbanks Ice Dogs defeated Minnesota Magicians 3-games-to-0
Robertson Cup Semifinals – Fairbanks Ice Dogs defeated Johnstown Tomahawks 2-games-to-1
Robertson Cup Championship game – Aberdeen Wings defeated Fairbanks Ice Dogs 2–1
2021
Divisional Semifinals – Minnesota Magicians defeated Fairbanks Ice Dogs 3-games-to-0

References

External links
 
 NAHL website

1997 establishments in Alaska
Sports in Fairbanks, Alaska
Ice hockey teams in Alaska
North American Hockey League teams
Ice hockey clubs established in 1997